James Desmond Melville Jr. (born 1957) is an American diplomat who has served as the United States Ambassador to Estonia from December 2015 to June 29, 2018, when he resigned as Ambassador, effective on July 29, 2018.

Career
James D. Melville graduated from Boston University with an honors degree in history, and from Rutgers University School of Law.

J. D. Melville's first Foreign Service assignment was in the U.S. Embassy to the German Democratic Republic from 1986 to 1988. He then served in Seychelles, St. Petersburg, at the U.S. Mission to NATO, and in Paris. In Washington, he worked in Legislative Affairs, as a Senior Watch Officer in the Operations Center, and at the Foreign Service Board of Examiners. From 2008 to 2010 he served as Minister-Counselor for Management Affairs at the Embassy in London. From 2010 to 2012, he served as Executive Director of the Bureaus of European and Eurasian Affairs and International Organization Affairs. As Executive Director of EUR and IO, Ambassador Melville directed support for all of EUR and IO's 79 overseas posts, as well as the domestic requirements for both bureaus.

Melville's most recent position with the State Department was as the Deputy Chief of Mission in the U.S. Embassy Berlin, Germany.

He was nominated by President Obama as the next U.S. Ambassador to Estonia on May 7, 2015, and confirmed by the Senate on August 5, 2015. He was sworn-in on September 18, 2015. He presented his credentials to President Toomas Hendrik Ilves on December 8, 2015. On June 29, 2018, he resigned as Ambassador over President Donald Trump’s statements in regards to NATO and the European Union, effective on July 29.

Personal life
Melville is originally from Bradley Beach, New Jersey. Melville speaks Russian, German, and French.

References

1957 births
Living people
People from Bradley Beach, New Jersey
Rutgers University alumni
Boston University College of Arts and Sciences alumni
Ambassadors of the United States to Estonia
United States Foreign Service personnel
Recipients of the Order of the Cross of Terra Mariana, 1st Class